In statistics, Cook's distance or Cook's D is a commonly used estimate of the influence of a data point when performing a least-squares regression analysis. In a practical ordinary least squares analysis, Cook's distance can be used in several ways: to indicate influential data points that are particularly worth checking for validity; or to indicate regions of the design space where it would be good to be able to obtain more data points. It is named after the American statistician R. Dennis Cook, who introduced the concept in 1977.

Definition
Data points with large residuals (outliers) and/or high leverage may distort the outcome and accuracy of a regression. Cook's distance measures the effect of deleting a given observation. Points with a large Cook's distance are considered to merit closer examination in the analysis.

For the algebraic expression, first define

 

where  is the  projection matrix (or hat matrix).

Cook's distance  of observation  is defined as the sum of all the changes in the regression model when observation  is removed from it

 

Equivalently, it can be expressed using the leverage:

Detecting highly influential observations
There are different opinions regarding what cut-off values to use for spotting highly influential points. Since this value is close to 1 for large , a simple operational guideline of  has been suggested.
Note that the Cook's distance measure does not always correctly identify influential observations.

Relationship to other influence measures (and interpretation)

 can be expressed using the leverage and the square of the internally Studentized residual, as follows:

 

If  is large then it (for non-extreme values of ) will increase .

 

 can be interpreted as the distance one's estimates move within the confidence ellipsoid that represents a region of plausible values for the parameters. This is shown by an alternative but equivalent representation of Cook's distance in terms of changes to the estimates of the regression parameters between the cases, where the particular observation is either included or excluded from the regression analysis.

An alternative to  has been proposed. Instead of considering the influence a single observation has on the overall model, the statistics  serves as a measure of how sensitive the prediction of the -th observation is to the deletion of each observation in the original data set. It can be formulated as a weighted linear combination of the 's of all data points. Again, the projection matrix is involved in the calculation to obtain the required weights:

 

An influential observation can be identified if

 

The factor 4.5 covers approx. 3 standard deviations of  around its centre.
When compared to Cook's distance,  was found to perform well for high- and intermediate-leverage outliers, even in presence of masking effects for which  failed.

 

With  at hand,  is given by:

 

where  if  is  symmetric and  idempotent, which is not necessarily the case. In contrast,  can be calculated as:

 

where  extracts the main diagonal of a square matrix . In this context,  is referred to as the influence matrix whereas  resembles the so-called sensitivity matrix.

Software implementations
Many programs and statistics packages, such as R, Python, etc., include implementations of Cook's distance.

Extensions

High-dimensional Influence Measure (HIM) is an alternative to Cook's distance for when  (i.e., when there are more predictors than observations). While the Cook's distance quantifies the individual observation's influence on the least squares regression coefficient estimate, the HIM measures the influence of an observation on the marginal correlations.

See also
 Outlier
 Leverage (statistics)
 Partial leverage
 DFFITS
 Studentized residual

Notes

References

Further reading
 
 
 
 

Regression diagnostics
Statistical outliers
Statistical distance